is a Japanese manufacturer of road and track bicycle components, founded in Nara, Japan, in 1910. It made a variety of cycling components, including cranksets and chainrings. After flagging in popularity due to Shimano's increased dominance of the Japanese bicycle component industry in the 1990s, the company has recently become more prominent, due to the rising popularity of fixed-gear bicycles and the cachet associated with the "Sugino 75" track racing equipment.

References

External links

 Official website 

Cycle parts manufacturers
Sporting goods manufacturers of Japan
Sportswear brands
1910 establishments in Japan
Companies based in Nara Prefecture
Manufacturing companies established in 1910
Japanese brands